Echinospartum is a genus of flowering plants in the family Fabaceae. It belongs to the subfamily Faboideae. It is possibly synonymous with Genista.

Species
Echinospartum comprises the following species:

 Echinospartum boissieri (Spach) Rothm.
 subsp. boissieri (Spach) Rothm.
 subsp. webbii (Spach) Greuter & Burdet
 Echinospartum horridum (M. Vahl) Rothm.
Echinospartum ibericum Rivas-Martínez, Sánchez-Mata
 subsp. algibicum (Talavera & Aparicio) Rivas Mart.
 subsp. ibericum Rivas-Martínez, Sánchez-Mata
 Echinospartum lugdunense (Jord.) Fourr.
 Echinospartum lusitanicum (L.) Rothm.
 subsp. barnadesii (Graells) Vicioso
 subsp. lusitanicum (L.) Rothm.

References

External links
Taxonomia

Genisteae
Fabaceae genera